Tinatin (Tina) Dalakishvili (born 2 February 1991, Tbilisi) is a Georgian actress and model.

Biography
Born on February 2, 1991, in Tbilisi, her name is translated from Georgian as Sunbeam. By profession she is a landscape designer. She has had no acting education.

At the age of 17 she began a modeling career. She starred in several commercials, where she was noticed by Georgian film directors. She also played in several short films. In 2010 she debuted in the feature film thriller Season, directed by Dato Borchkhadze. The first fame she brought the role of Lesya in the romantic comedy by Rezo Gigineishvili  Love with an Accent. Dalakishvili got into the project almost at the last moment, because initially Oksana Akinshina had to play Lesya.

In the film, she was noticed by director Anna Melikian, who personally flew to meet with the young actress in Georgia. In the Melikian movie Star, Tina played a major role.

She has become known overseas thanks to the distribution of the English-language sci-fi/fantasy film Abigail, in which Dalakishvili plays the title role.

Personal life
Since 2019, Tinatin lives with her partner Nikusha Antadze.

References

External links

 Тинатин Далакишвили — звезда из новой плеяды молодых актёров
 Актриса Тинатин Далакишвили:  Для актёра важно быть разносторонним человеком, поэтому я работала официанткой, консультантом, продавцом и даже выгуливала собак

1991 births
Living people
Actors from Tbilisi
Female models from Georgia (country)
21st-century actresses from Georgia (country)
Film actresses from Georgia (country)